The 1895 Cornell Big Red football team was an American football team that represented Cornell University during the 1895 college football season.  In their second season under head coach Marshall Newell, the Big Red compiled a 3–4–1 record and outscored all opponents by a combined total of 162 to 82. Quarterback and team captain Clint Wyckoff was selected by both Walter Camp and Caspar Whitney as a first-team player on the 1895 College Football All-America Team and was later inducted into the College Football Hall of Fame.

Schedule

References

Cornell
Cornell Big Red football seasons
Cornell Big Red football